The 1919–20 Yorkshire Cup was the twelfth occasion on which the Yorkshire Cup competition had been held. This season saw the  junior/amateur club Featherstone Rovers being invited again, and this, together with the restart-up of Keighley after the wartime close-down, resulted in an increase of one bringing the total entries up to fourteen. This in turn resulted in two byes in the first round.

This year saw the cup holders retain the trophy after winning for the  fourth successive time, with Huddersfield winning the trophy by beating Leeds by the score of 24-5 in the final. The match was played at Thrum Hall, Halifax, now in West Yorkshire. The attendance was 24,935 and receipts were ££2,096. This was Huddersfield's seventh appearance in what had been seven appearances in eight consecutive finals between 1909 and this season (which included four successive victories and six in total), and who knows, but for the intervention of the First World War and suspension of the competition, it may have been more. It was also the fourth consecutive win.

Background 
The Rugby Football League's Yorkshire Cup competition was a knock-out competition between (mainly professional) rugby league clubs from  the  county of Yorkshire. The actual area was at times increased to encompass other teams from  outside the  county such as Newcastle, Mansfield, Coventry, and even London (in the form of Acton & Willesden. The competition always took place early in the season, in the Autumn, with the final taking place in (or just before) December (The only exception to this was when disruption of the fixture list was caused during, and immediately after, the two World Wars)

Competition and Results

Round 1 
Involved  6 matches (with two byes) and 14 clubs

Round 2 – quarterfinals 
Involved 4 matches and 8 clubs

Round 3 – semifinals  
Involved 2 matches and 4 clubs

Final

Teams and scorers 

Scoring - Try = three (3) points - Goal = two (2) points - Drop goal = two (2) points

The road to success

Notes 
1 * Featherstone Rovers were at the time a junior/amateur club. They eventually joined the League for season 1921-22

2 * Thrum Hall was the home ground of Halifax with a final capacity of 9,832 (The attendance record of 29,153 was set on 21 March 1959 for a third round Challenge Cup tie v  Wigan). The club finally moved out in 1998 to take part ownership and ground-share with Halifax Town FC at The Shay Stadium.

See also 
1919–20 Northern Rugby Football Union season
Rugby league county cups

References

External links
Saints Heritage Society
1896–97 Northern Rugby Football Union season at wigan.rlfans.com
Hull&Proud Fixtures & Results 1896/1897
Widnes Vikings - One team, one passion Season In Review - 1896-97
The Northern Union at warringtonwolves.org

1919 2
Yorkshire Cup 2